William E. Bennett is a senior scholar with the National Center for Science and Civic Engagement. He also has been a senior fellow with the Association of American Colleges and Universities. In recent years, he has served on boards and committees of university and academic associations, journals and the National Institutes of Health.

Bennett received his bachelor's degree from Lincoln University in Pennsylvania in 1950, and M.S. and Ph.D. from Temple University and the University of Pennsylvania, respectively. He was awarded a National Institutes of Health postdoctoral fellowship to work with noted Professor Zanvil A. Cohn and Nobel Prize winner Fritz Lipmann, at the Rockefeller University. Bennet holds two honorary doctorates and one from his alma mater, Lincoln University (2010). He is also a member of Alpha Phi Alpha.

Publications

References

American immunologists
Members of the United States National Academy of Sciences
Members of the National Academy of Medicine
Living people
African-American academics
Year of birth missing (living people)
21st-century African-American people